Micridyla is a monotypic genus of gastropods belonging to the family Clausiliidae. The only species is Micridyla pinteri.

The species is found in Europe.

References

Clausiliidae